Yedineniye (unity or unification) may refer to:

 Yedineniye (newspaper), a Russian newspaper in Australia
 Conceptual Party "Unity" (Yedineniye), a defunct political party in Russia